The Kern County Sheriff's Office is the agency responsible for law enforcement within Kern County, California, in the United States. The agency provides: law enforcement within the county, maintain the jails used by both the county and municipalities, and provides search and rescue. The headquarters is in Bakersfield with 15 substations located throughout the county. The metro patrol area is divided into four regions: north, south, east, and west. The Sheriff's Office has over 1,200 sworn officers and civilian employees.

Station and substations
The Sheriff's Office is headquartered at 1350 Norris Road in Bakersfield. There are 15 additional substations located throughout the county. They are:

Boron
Buttonwillow
Delano
Frazier Park
Glennville
Kern Valley
Lamont
Mojave
Ridgecrest
Rosamond
Rosedale
Taft
Tehachapi
Walker Basin
Wasco

Fallen officers
Since the establishment of the Kern County Sheriff's Office, 28 officers and citizen volunteers have died while on duty.

On July 25, 2021, Kern County Sheriff's Office Deputy Phillip Campas was killed in the line of duty. Campas was struck by gunfire while entering a residence with a SWAT team formation in an attempt to suppress an active-shooter that had executed family members and was holding additional family hostage. Campas suffered severe injuries in the ambush and was immediately evacuated and transported for medical care. Campas succumbed to the injuries he received.

Campas is a 5-year veteran of the Kern County Sheriff's Office. He has held various assignments including patrol, recruit training officer, SWAT and held a range assignment where he provided firearms training and mentoring to all departmental armed staff. Campas served as a United States Marine prior to being employed with the Sheriff's Office.

Electoral history 
The current sheriff, Donny Youngblood, was reelected on June 5, 2018. Chief Deputy Justin Fleeman unsuccessfully contested Sheriff Donny Youngblood in the June 2018 primary election. Fleeman's campaign made a point to expose corruption and ethics violations by Sheriff Youngblood and the Kern County Sheriff's Office. Youngblood in turn criticized Fleeman for attempting to ruin his reputation and the reputation of the department. On May 29, 2019, Fleeman was fired after having been placed on administrative leave on September 20, 2018. In response to his firing, Fleeman filed a wrongful termination lawsuit which he hopes will unfold in court and result in "people seeing I was actually truthful during the campaign". The court granted the county's move to dismiss on the ground that Fleeman failed to state a cognizable claim under Labor Code Section 232.5.

Rank structure

Notable incidents

In 2006, Sheriff Donny Youngblood declared it was "better financially" for Kern County to commit a "bad shooting" and kill a suspect, then pay the family "three million bucks", versus them crippling a suspect and having to "take care of them for life".

In December 2010, Jose Lucero, a recovering drug addict with mental health issues, died after a confrontation with Kern County Sheriff's deputies. The family contended that the deputies beat Lucero to death. In November 2012, Lucero's family was awarded a $4.5 million judgment in a wrongful death lawsuit against the deputies, the sheriff's office, and Kern County.

On May 9, 2013, it was reported that Bakersfield resident David Sal Silva died after resisting arrest. The assault on Silva was video recorded by multiple witnesses, although the resultant video was seized by law enforcement on the scene. Silva's autopsy report uses the description "acute intoxication" to describe Silva's condition when he died. His blood alcohol level was 0.095, over the limit for driving a motor vehicle. The autopsy also found methamphetamine and amphetamine, both stimulants, in Silva's blood.

In December 2015, press reports indicated Kern County law enforcement officers killed more people per capita than any other county in the United States. In May 2015, it was reported that the Kern Country Sheriff's Department settled two civil lawsuits in five days in misconduct cases. One settlement, reported to be in the amount of $1 million, was paid out to a survivor of a sexual assault committed by Kern County Sheriff's Deputy Gabriel Lopez. The Kern County Sheriff's office has been found to have a longstanding program of attempting cash payoffs to women who have accused deputies of sexual assault.

Weapons
Deputies are allowed to carry the Glock 22 .40 S&W handgun which is usually equipped with a tactical flashlight and has night sights. The Glock Model 23 .40 S&W is also an option for deputies to choose from as well. All of the Glock pistols have a 5 lb trigger pull.

In addition to the Glock pistols deputies also have access to AR-15 5.56×45mm rifles as well. Deputies also have access to the Remington 870 pump shotgun.

See also
List of law enforcement agencies in California
Bakersfield Police Department

References

External links
Kern County Sheriff's Office

Sheriffs' departments of California
Government of Kern County, California
1866 establishments in California